Diploctenium is an extinct genus of stony corals belonging to the family Meandrinidae.

Fossil record
This genus is known in the fossil record from the Cretaceous to the Paleocene (from about 89.3 to 61.7 million years ago). Fossils of species within this genus can be found in Austria, Croatia, France, Georgia, the Netherlands, Oman, Spain and in the United Arab Emirates.

Species
Species within this genus include:
 Diploctenium affine †
 Diploctenium arnaudi †
 Diploctenium corbariensis †
 Diploctenium cordatum †
 Diploctenium crassicostatum†
 Diploctenium cureti †
 Diploctenium enigma †
 Diploctenium epagnacensis †
 Diploctenium ferrumequinum †
 Diploctenium gracile †
 Diploctenium Jacobi †
 Diploctenium lamellosum †
 Diploctenium lunatum †
 Diploctenium lutaudi †
 Diploctenium matheroni †
 Diploctenium mixtum †
 Diploctenium parvum †
 Diploctenium petrocoriensis †
 Diploctenium plumum †
 Diploctenium provincialis †
 Diploctenium simplex †
 Diploctenium subcirculare †
 Diploctenium toucasi †
 Diploctenium uxacalcensis †

References

External links
 Granada Natural)

Meandrinidae
Prehistoric Hexacorallia genera
Prehistoric invertebrates of Europe